Kana or Káňa is a surname. Notable people include:
 André Kana-Biyik (born 1965), Cameroonian footballer
 Jan Káňa (ice hockey, born 1990), Czech ice hockey player
 Jan Káňa (ice hockey, born 1992), Czech ice hockey player
 Jean-Armel Kana-Biyik (born 1989), Cameroonian footballer
 Johan Kana (1882–1934), Estonian politician
 Marco Kana (born 2002), Belgian footballer
 Sébastien Ndzana Kana (born 1983), Cameroonian footballer
 Tomáš Káňa (born 1987), Czech ice hockey player

See also
 

Czech-language surnames